Amy Mercado is an American politician of Puerto Rican descent who has served as the property appraiser of Orange County, Florida since 2021. Previously, she served two terms in the Florida House of Representatives from 2016 to 2020, representing parts of the Orlando area. She is a member of the Florida Democratic Party.

See also 
 Florida House of Representatives
 List of people from the Bronx

References

21st-century American women
American InterContinental University alumni
American politicians of Puerto Rican descent
Hispanic and Latino American state legislators in Florida
Hispanic and Latino American women in politics
Living people
Democratic Party members of the Florida House of Representatives
People from Orlando, Florida
Politicians from the Bronx
Puerto Rican people in Florida politics
Strayer University alumni
Women state legislators in Florida
Year of birth missing (living people)